Daniela Lavender, Lady Kingsley ( Barbosa de Carneiro; 14 December 1974) is a Brazilian actress, appearing on Brazilian television and on English-language television, film and stage, including touring with the British Shakespeare Company.

Early life
Lavender was born in Bahia, Brazil, daughter of a policeman father and English teacher mother. At the age of eight, Lavender began training in ballet, jazz and contemporary dance. Lavender studied Flamenco dancing under Roberto Amaral and Yolanda Arroyo in Los Angeles. Lavender received a journalism degree from Pontifical Catholic University of Rio de Janeiro and studied drama at Dirceu de Mattos  school in Rio de Janeiro, studied English for a year and traveled to London. She auditioned for the London International School of Performing Arts, playing 'Queen Anne' from Shakespeare's Richard III, and passed the audition in spite of the language barrier.

Acting career
Lavender appeared in the low budget independent film Emotional Backgammon (2003), and was awarded "Best Actress" at the Denver Film Festival. Lavender appeared in Ali G Indahouse and the BBC series Longitude, EastEnders, and Casualty. Lavender toured with the British Shakespeare Company production of A Midsummer Night’s Dream in 2009, playing Hippolyta and Titania. She made her theatre debut at London's Tabard Theatre in March 2011 in A Woman Alone (produced by Jason Greer).

Other work
Lavender has supported Action for Brazil's Children Trust (ABC) as an ambassador, to raise awareness and funding to assist the disadvantaged.

Personal life
In her professional life, Lavender uses the surname of her first husband, Ben Lavender, to whom she was married from 1996 to 2003. She married, secondly, to actor Ben Kingsley on 3 September 2007.

Filmography

Film and television

Theatre

References

External links

"As brasileiras de Bollywood". Globo.
"Ben Kingsley's Wife Attracts the crowds to Dublin drama". Herald.ie
"The Stars Come Out to Play". Globe and Mail.
"Ben Kingsley gets romantic at Taj". GlamSham.com.

Living people
Brazilian film actresses
Brazilian expatriates in the United Kingdom
People from Bahia
1974 births
Wives of knights